Hayal Pozanti (born 1983, Istanbul, Turkey) is a Turkish-born artist, based in the United States. She is known for her large scale, brightly colored, seemingly abstract and geometric paintings, that represent statistical data related to human-computer interaction.

Life and work 
Hayal Pozanti studied visual arts and visual communication design at Sabancı University in Istanbul and went on to study at Yale University, receiving a M.F.A. in painting and printmaking in 2011. Her work is informed by her ongoing exploration of "cyborg anthropology", which she describes as "a framework for understanding the effects of technology on human beings and culture".

Her work Ciphers (2015) was a direct rendering of data into a glyph alphabet, and limiting herself to the creation of 31 characters. The paintings from Ciphers (2015) feature layered abstractions of the shapes, and were displayed in the gallery with abstract sculptures of similar shapes. 

Pozanti revisited this theme of alphabet in her work named Instant Paradise (2017), where again she has invented alphabet of 31 shapes. This lexicon is the source material for her paintings, sculptures, animations and sound pieces. Each shape in Instant Paradise has been assigned a number and a letter from the English alphabet, allowing her to literally 'translate' information through a personalized encryption system. She has created a typeface from her characters, as well as phonemes that she resources for her animations and her sound pieces, respectively. 

Pozanti's work is in several public museum collections, including Los Angeles County Museum of Art (LACMA), Eli and Edythe Broad Art Museum, and the San Jose Museum of Art.

Exhibitions

Solo exhibitions 

 2018 – Murmurs of Earth, Jessica Silverman Gallery, San Francisco, California
 2017 – .tr, Dirimart, Istanbul, Turkey
 2016 – Fuzzy Logic, Rachel Uffner Gallery, New York City, New York
 2016 – Corpus, Levy.Delval, Brussels, Belgium
 2015 – Deep Learning, Aldrich Contemporary Art Museum, Ridgefield, Connecticut
 2015 – Scrambler, Halsey Mckay Gallery, East Hampton, New York
 2015 – Ciphers, Jessica Silverman Gallery, San Francisco, California
 2013 – Passwords, Duve, Berlin, Germany
 2013 – New Paintings, Susanne Vielmetter Los Angeles Projects, Los Angeles, California
 2012 – Co-Real, Jessica Silverman Gallery, San Francisco California

Group exhibitions 
Pozanti's work has  been featured in group exhibitions at Public Art Fund, Brooklyn Academy of Music, The Kitchen, MCA Santa Barbara, Cornell Fine Arts Museum, and the Sabanci Museum, Istanbul.

References 

1983 births
Living people
21st-century Turkish women artists
Artists from Istanbul
Turkish women painters
Yale University alumni
Digital artists
Women digital artists